Global Underground 013: Sasha, Ibiza is a DJ mix album in the Global Underground series, compiled and mixed by Sasha. In a 2019 poll conducted on Global Underground’s website, the album was voted the best in the series.

Track listing

Disc one
 Raff 'n' Freddy - "Deep Progress" – 8:42
 MRE - "The Deep Edge" – 2:42
 Resistance D - "Feel High (Humate Mix)" – 5:39
 Dominica - "Real Time" – 4:25
 Medway - "The Baseline Track" – 6:51
 Sander Kleinenberg - "My Lexicon" – 4:54
 Orbital - "Nothing Left (Breeder Remix)" – 8:06
 Christian Smith & John Selway - "Move!" – 6:21
 Jimpy & Sarah - "Talkin' (Tarrantella vs Redanka Remix)" – 7:01
 Space Manoeuvres - "Stage One (Pariah Remix)" – 5:16
 Sander Kleinenberg - "Sacred" – 4:10
 Natious - "Amber" – 5:58

Disc two
 BT - "Fibonacci Sequence" – 10:23
 Paganini Traxx - "Zoe (Timo Maas Mix)" – 6:20
 Cass & Slide - "Perception" – 9:25
 Pob - "The Fly" – 5:33
 Sasha - "Xpander" – 9:36
 Bluefish - "One" – 6:41
 BT - "Mercury and Solace" – 7:28
 Acquilla - "Dreamstate (LSG Mix)" – 4:32
 Junkie XL - "Future in Computer Hell, part 2" – 6:34
 Bedrock - "Heaven Scent/Lifeline" – 7:20

References

External links 

Global Underground
Sasha (DJ) albums
1999 albums
DJ mix albums